Katarzyna Gajgał-Anioł (née Biel) (born 21 September 1981) is a Polish volleyball player, a member of Poland women's national volleyball team in 2003–14 and Polish club KPS Chemik Police, a participant of the Olympic Games Beijing 2008, bronze medalist of European Championship 2009, four-time Polish Champion (2004, 2011, 2014, 2015).

Personal life
She married on July 9, 2005. On January 23, 2007, she gave birth to a son named Filip. On June 2, 2012, she married Radosław Anioł, and it is her second marriage.

Career

National team
In October 2009 she won with teammates the bronze medal of European Championship 2009 after winning the match against Germany.

Sporting achievements

Clubs

National championships
 1999/2000  Polish Championship, with BKS Stal Bielsko-Biała
 2002/2003  Polish Championship, with BKS Stal Bielsko-Biała
 2003/2004  Polish Cup, with BKS Stal Bielsko-Biała
 2003/2004  Polish Championship, with BKS Stal Bielsko-Biała
 2005/2006  Polish Cup, with BKS Stal Bielsko-Biała
 2008/2009  Polish Cup, with BKS Stal Bielsko-Biała
 2008/2009  Polish Championship, with BKS Stal Bielsko-Biała
 2009/2010  Polish Championship, with Enionem Energia MKS Dąbrowa Górnicza
 2010/2011  Polish Cup, with Bank BPS Muszynianka Fakro Muszyna
 2010/2011  Polish Championship, with Bank BPS Muszynianka Fakro Muszyna
 2011/2012  Polish SuperCup 2011, with Bank BPS Muszynianka Fakro Muszyna
 2011/2012  Polish Championship, with Bank BPS Muszynianka Fakro Muszyna
 2012/2013  Polish Championship, with Bank BPS Muszynianka Fakro Muszyna
 2013/2014  Polish Cup, with KPS Chemik Police
 2013/2014  Polish Championship, with KPS Chemik Police
 2014/2015  Polish SuperCup 2014, with KPS Chemik Police
 2014/2015  Polish Championship, with KPS Chemik Police

National team
 2005  Universiade
 2009  CEV European Championship

References

External links
 ORLENLiga player profile

1981 births
Living people
People from Dębica
Sportspeople from Podkarpackie Voivodeship
Polish women's volleyball players
Olympic volleyball players of Poland
Volleyball players at the 2008 Summer Olympics